The Directorate General of  National Security Intelligence, commonly known as the NSI, is the principal civilian intelligence agency of the People's Republic of Bangladesh. The NSI's headquarters is in 1 Segunbagicha, Dhaka, Bangladesh. The NSI is the leading body of the Government of Bangladesh in the field of internal security, counter terrorism, counter intelligence and foreign intelligence. NSI is the largest among the intelligence agencies in Bangladesh, the others being the Directorate General of Forces Intelligence (DGFI), SB, CID, PBI and intelligence directorates of armed and paramilitary forces. The agency stands under the direct authority of the Prime Minister of Bangladesh.

This is an independent civilian intelligence agency. Today, its internal security functions are similar to the British Security Service MI5, while the foreign intelligence function does not quite resemble the MI6. Like other intelligence agencies, NSI is believed to have offices in foreign countries, which are based on Bangladeshi diplomatic missions abroad. The NSI also has territorial units in all of the 64 districts of Bangladesh, headed by a Joint Director/Deputy Director.

Being the only independent civilian intelligence agency in Bangladesh, the NSI's principal activities are gathering information about foreign governments, individuals, corporations, political parties, different religious groups; counter-terrorism, counter-intelligence, political intelligence, and giving protection to the VIPs & VVIPs are among its major functions.

Organization
 National Security Intelligence is headed by a Director General (D.G.), who is a two-star military officer. The key posts of this organization are Director, Additional Director, Joint Director, Deputy Director, and Assistant Director. Some other posts are Computer Engineer, Telephone Engineer, Research Officer. Some directorates of NSI are internal, city internal, border, external, security, media wing, training, administration, counter-terrorism cell, and intelligence.     
 The force is mostly staffed by civil personnel. Officers are recruited by the  Prime Minister's Office, Class-1 officers directly recruited by the agency starts with the post of Assistant Director (Grade-9).
 Officers are also seconded from Bangladesh Police, Armed Forces of Bangladesh, Bangladesh Ansar.

List of directors general
 A. B. S. Safdar (1977-?)
 Major General Golam Kader
 Brigadier General AJM Aminul Haque, Bir Uttom (1993 -1996)
 Mohammad Wahidul Haque (acting; 1996 – 1997)
 Kazi Moshiur Rahman (1998-2000)
 Brigadier General Abdur Rahim (2001 – 5 January 2005)
 Major General Rezzakul Haider Chowdhury (5 January 2005 –2008)
 Major General Sheikh Md Monirul Islam (20 April 2008 – 17 March 2009)

 Brigadier General (rtd) M Manzur Ahmed (17 March 2009 – 25 March 2014)
 Major General Shamsul Haque (25 March 2014 – 31 July 2018)
 Major General T. M. Jobaer (since 31 July 2018)

Duties
The principal activities of the NSI National Security Intelligence are:
 Gathering information by any or all means about foreign governments, organizations, individuals, and politicians;  monitor Bangladeshi government officials, political parties, politicians, extremist groups, separatists, religious bodies, unions, popular movements, NGOs, and any other group or person who might be relevant to national security;  
 Analysing that information, along with intelligence gathered by other Bangladesh intelligence agencies, to provide intelligence assessments to the PM and the National Committee for Intelligence Coordination
 Upon executive orders carrying out or overseeing covert activities overseas, by its own employees, by members of the military, or by other partner forces.

Controversies

Human Rights abuses
According to Human Rights Watch's May 2009 issue, during the 2006–08 Bangladeshi political crisis in Bangladesh, the NSI was actively involved in harassment and arbitrary arrest of labor activists.

Ten-truck arms and ammunition haul in Chittagong

Several high ranking NSI officers and field officers were sacked by the BNP government after being found connected with the 10-Truck Arms and Ammunition Haul in Chittagong case and were later convicted, who were: 
 Former Director General of NSI: Brigadier General Abdur Rahim.
 Former Director: Wing Commander Shahabuddin Ahmed
 Former Assistant Director: Major Liakat Hossain
 Former Field Officer: Akbar Hossain

Killing of labour activists

NSI's name had appeared several times during the trial of the mysterious murder of labor rights activist Aminul Islam in April 2012. The only convict, Aminul's friend Mostafijur Rahman was found a mystery man, about whom no one knew much, who apparently had a cover job at an EPZ clinic and regularly met with security officers, is believed to be linked with NSI, though the court has not asked the agency for clarification and nor did the prosecution try to bring them, media has speculated such controversies, though denied by the agency.

In Fiction 

 In the Web TV Series Contract (2021), Arifin Shuvoo played the character of Bastard a fictional codename of a retired NSI Agent and Hitman who was given the last task to hunt down an underworld drug-lord named Black Ranju (played by Chanchal Chowdhury)

See also 
 National Committee for Intelligence Coordination
 Directorate General of Forces Intelligence
 Counter Terrorism and Intelligence Bureau

References

Bangladeshi intelligence agencies
1972 establishments in Bangladesh
 Government agencies established in 1972